Aberystwyth Old Students' Association, founded in 1892, is Aberystwyth University's alumni association and is one of the oldest such associations in the United Kingdom. It currently has more than 9,500 Members and 83,000 Associate Members worldwide.

History 
It was founded on 2 March 1892, by a group of former students in Aberystwyth to mark St David's Day. The first President was the politician Thomas Edward Ellis MP and the first Vice-President was the College's Principal, Thomas Francis Roberts. 

The Oxford, Cambridge and London Branches were established before 1900, with Swansea, Cardiff and Northern England Branches created in 1899 and branches in India, Myanmar (Burma) and Sri Lanka (Ceylon) followed in 1923. 

Celebrations for the OSA's Centenary took place in 1992 with various dinners and dances and the launch of the Alumni Magazine Prom. The 125th Anniversary was marked with a Gala Dinner.

Activities  

The Association (OSA), as an independent body, has supported the university throughout its history and has raised substantial sums to support the university's work. 

Every Easter, the Association holds a Reunion in Aberystwyth. The OSA has also organised Public Lectures, such as the Llandaff Lectures at Howell's School in Cardiff and the Llandovery Lectures at Llandovery College.

An Aberystwyth Branch was established in 1934, and there are now are nine branches in various parts of Wales, England, Northern Ireland and four overseas.

Members 
All university alumni are automatically enrolled as Associate Members and Life Membership is open to all students and staff of Aberystwyth University. The Association's Members have included various distinguished Aberystwyth University alumni. Membership has grown from 329 Members in 1922 to 570 in 1939. In 1960 there were 898 Members and now more than 9,500.

Presidents

References

External links 
 

Aberystwyth University
Alumni associations
1892 establishments in Wales
Organizations established in 1892
Aberystwyth Old Students' Association